Ford Wood is a woodland in Cambridgeshire, England, near Bassingbourn. It is owned and managed by the Woodland Trust.

References

Forests and woodlands of Cambridgeshire
South Cambridgeshire District